Donald Gene Davis (born August 29, 1971) is an American educator and politician serving as the U.S. representative for North Carolina's 1st congressional district since 2023.

Davis represented the 5th district in the North Carolina Senate from 2013 to 2023. He was first elected to the post in 2008, representing Pitt, Wayne, and Greene counties. He was defeated for reelection in 2010, but ran and won a Senate seat for the newly redrawn 5th district in the 2012 election.

Early life and education

Davis was born in the town of Snow Hill. In 1989, he graduated from McArthur High School in Irving, Texas. He earned a Bachelor of Science in social sciences from the United States Air Force Academy. Davis earned a Master of Science in Administration degree with a concentration in general administration from Central Michigan University and a Master of Arts in sociology degree with a concentration in social issues in regional development from East Carolina University. He also earned a Doctor of Education in educational leadership with a concentration in higher education administration from East Carolina University. Davis has completed courses in the Commissioned Lay Minister Program through the New Hope Presbytery, Presbyterian Church United States of America.

Early political career
Elected mayor of Snow Hill in 2001, Davis also chaired North Carolina's 1st congressional district Democratic Party. He filed to run for the U.S. House of Representatives in the 1st district in 2004, but dropped out before the primary election.

In 2005, Davis was reelected as mayor. On October 1, 2007, he announced plans to file for the North Carolina Senate District 5 seat. Davis was one of six Democratic candidates to file for the seat held by retiring Senator John Kerr III. He received the most votes, 36%, in the May 6, 2008, primary election.

As Davis did not receive the 40% of the vote required to win the primary, he faced Kathy Taft in a runoff. On June 24, 2008, Davis won the Democratic nomination with 63% of the vote in the runoff. He faced North Carolina Representative Louis Pate, a Wayne County Republican, in the general election.

On November 4, 2008, Davis defeated Pate with 53% of the vote. His term began on January 1, 2009.

In a rematch of the 2008 election, Pate defeated Davis in the 2010 election.

In October 2013, Davis went on a legislative visit to China sponsored by the Chinese People's Association for Friendship with Foreign Countries. In October 2020, the United States State Department designated the association a "foreign mission", saying that it "sought to directly and malignly influence" U.S. state and local leaders to promote China’s global agenda.

In July 2014, it was reported that Davis had "met with a group of Chinese medical exchange students from Wuhan" to "discuss the role politics plays in health care".

Davis ran unopposed in 2016. He defeated Pitt County District Attorney Kimberly Robb in the 2018 election.

Committee assignments
Agriculture, Energy, and Environment
Appropriations on Education/Higher Education 
Education/Higher Education 
Health Care 
Redistricting and Elections
Rules and Operations of the Senate
Select Committee on Nominations
Select Committee on Storm Related River Debris and Damage in NC

U.S. House of Representatives

Elections

2022 

Davis announced his candidacy for the U.S. House of Representatives to succeed retiring Democrat G. K. Butterfield. He won the Democratic primary for the 2022 election for North Carolina's 1st congressional district, defeating former state senator Erica D. Smith. In November 2022, Davis won the general election, defeating Republican nominee Sandy Smith.

Caucus memberships 

 New Democrat Coalition

See also
List of African-American United States representatives

References

External links

 Congressman Don Davis official U.S. House website
Don Davis for Congress campaign website

|-

|-

|-

1971 births
20th-century African-American people
21st-century African-American politicians
21st-century American politicians
African-American mayors in North Carolina
African-American members of the United States House of Representatives
African-American state legislators in North Carolina
American Presbyterians
Central Michigan University alumni
Democratic Party members of the United States House of Representatives from North Carolina
Democratic Party North Carolina state senators
East Carolina University alumni
East Carolina University faculty
Living people
Mayors of places in North Carolina
People from Snow Hill, North Carolina
Protestants from North Carolina
United States Air Force Academy alumni
United States Air Force officers